Jean-Luc Ruty (born 5 July 1959 in Arbois, France) is a football former defender and manager.

References

Biography and interview

Living people
1959 births
French footballers
France under-21 international footballers
FC Sochaux-Montbéliard players
Toulouse FC players
Ligue 1 players
French football managers
Toulouse FC managers
FC Sochaux-Montbéliard managers

Association football defenders